Woodland Public Schools (WPS) or Woodland School District #404 (WSD) is a school district headquartered in Woodland, Washington.

It includes Woodland and Cougar in Cowlitz County. It also includes sections of Clark County.

 it has approximately 2,250 students.

History
In January 2007 the district added impact fees on houses in the Clark County section and in houses in the city limits of Woodland. That year it proposed that Cowlitz County add impact fees on houses in the district in order to pay for new facilities. The Cowlitz county attorney stated that he was not sure whether the plan complied with Washington state law.

In 2007 superintendent Bill Hundley chose to retire.

In 2015 four of the five members of the board of education signed a letter in support of superintendent Michael Green. The other board member was absent. The board collectively stated that the school district was inaccurately being depicted in the media as being in a disarray.

Schools

 Secondary
 Woodland High School
 Woodland Middle School
In 2015 there was turmoil as the school district leadership removed multiple employees from their posts. There were protests against the district leadership with parents criticizing a perceived lack of openness with the community. That year it became a grade 5–8 facility and Jake Hall became the principal.
 TEAM High School (alternative)
 Primary
 Columbia Elementary School
 North Fork Elementary School
 Yale Elementary School
 Other
 Lewis River Academy (alternative)

References

External links

School districts in Washington (state)
Education in Clark County, Washington
Education in Cowlitz County, Washington
Educational institutions with year of establishment missing